is a passenger railway station located in Tarumi-ku, Kobe, Hyōgo Prefecture, Japan, operated by the private Sanyo Electric Railway.

Lines

Station layout
The station consists of two unnumbered side platforms connected by an elevated station building.

Platforms

Adjacent stations

|-
!colspan=5|Sanyo Electric Railway

History
Takinochaya Station opened on April 12, 1917.

Passenger statistics
In fiscal 2018, the station was used by an average of 2814 passengers daily (boarding passengers only).

Surrounding area
 Hyogo Prefectural Visual Special Needs School
 Kobe Municipal Higashi Tarumizu Elementary School

See also
List of railway stations in Japan

References

External links

 Official website (Sanyo Electric Railway) 

Railway stations in Japan opened in 1917
Railway stations in Kobe